Vytenis Lipkevičius (born May 19, 1989) is a Lithuanian professional basketball player for Lietkabelis Panevėžys of the Lithuanian Basketball League (LKL).

Professional career
On 11 August 2010, Lipkevičius joined Rūdupis Prienai  of the LKL, after being loaned by Žalgiris Kaunas. For the 2011–12 season, he went on loan to Baltai Kaunas. On 28 October 2011, Lipkevičius was brought back from his loan by Žalgiris. On 24 July 2013, Lipkevičius re-signed with the club until the end of the 2015–16 season. On 20 July 2015, he signed a new two-year contact with Žalgiris. On 12 September 2016, Lipkevičius mutually parted ways with the club and subsequently joined Vytautas Prienai-Birštonas.

On 10 June 2017, Lipkevičius signed a one-year deal with s.Oliver Würzburg of the German Basketball Bundesliga.

On 12 July 2018, Lipkevičius signed a two-year contract with Lietkabelis Panevėžys of the Lithuanian Basketball League (LKL). On 6 November, he was loaned to Skycop Prienai for the remainder of the season. On 2 July 2022, he re-signed with Lietkabelis until 2024.

References

External links
 Vytenis Lipkevičius at eurobasket.com
 Vytenis Lipkevičius at euroleague.net
 Vytenis Lipkevičius at realgm.com

1989 births
Living people
BC Lietkabelis players
BC Prienai players
BC Žalgiris players
BC Žalgiris-2 players
Lithuanian expatriate basketball people in Germany
Lithuanian men's basketball players
LSU-Atletas basketball players
People from Kaunas District Municipality
S.Oliver Würzburg players
Forwards (basketball)